Mycetophila luctuosa is a Palearctic species of  'fungus gnats' in the family Mycetophilidae. Mycetophila luctuosa  is found in forest or wooded areas where the larvae develop in Neolentinus lepideus, Kretzschmaria deusta, Chondrostereum purpureum, Sebacina incrustans, Neolentinus tigrinus, Pleurotus spp., Trametes versicolor and a wide range of epigeic fungi, mostly Russulaceae.

References

External links
 Images representing  Mycetophila luctuosa at BOLD

Mycetophilidae